Laguna College of Business and Arts (formerly Laguna Institute) or LCBA is a private non-sectarian school in Calamba, Laguna, Philippines. The campus was established in June 1930, as the first secondary school in Calamba.

History
The Laguna Institute formally opened in June 1930 with 95 students in the first and second year high school. The original Laguna Institute was an old, two-storey, green and white rented house; which stood on a  lot still unpaved Burgos Street. In 1933, it was fully recognized by the Department of Public Institutions as a duly accredited high school.

L.I. was closed until 1945 due to World War II. In 1950, L.I. inaugurated its elementary and college departments.  The tertiary level courses offered were Associate in Commercial Science, Elementary Teacher's Certificate, and Associate in Arts. Later, Bachelor of Secondary Education, Bachelor of Elementary Education, Bachelor of Science in commerce, Bachelor of Arts and Junior Secretarial Courses were offered.  In 1994, Bachelor of Science in Secretarial Administration, Bachelor of Science in Computer Engineering, Bachelor of Science in Computer Science started to admit college students for their courses.  TESDA Courses were then offered, Computer Programming NC IV, Practical Nursing, Housekeeping, Food and Beverage, Commercial Cooking and Bartending. Currently, the new courses of the College Department include Bachelor of Science in Hotel and Restaurant Management, Bachelor of Elementary Education major in Preschool Education, Bachelor of Secondary Education major in Physical Science, Biological Science and Technology and Livelihood Education and Bachelor of Science in Psychology.

The elementary department reopened in 1989 since its closure in 1953.  It was preceded by two years of pre-elementary education: Nursery, Kindergarten and Preparatory courses.  L.I. became Laguna College of Business and Arts (LCBA) in 1980.

Meanwhile, the graduate school opened in school year 1977–1978 with Master of Arts in teaching. Today, the programs offered are: Master in Management (MM) major in Public Administration and Educational Management, Master in Business Administration (MBA), Master of Arts in education   (MAEd) major in English, Filipino, social studies, administration and supervision, and guidance and counseling and Master of Science in psychology.

Name change
The name of the school was changed from its original name - Laguna Institute - to - Laguna College of Business and Arts (LCBA) - in 1979.

Campus

The LCBA campus is located in the center of Calamba, Laguna in the growth region of Calabarzon. The  campus has a classroom in all levels of which can  accommodate  40-50 students per class. The campus houses complementary facilities for sports, extracurricular activities and school functions such as a multi-purpose quadrangle, newly constructed audio-visual room, cyber hubs, library, multi-purpose hall, gymnasium, science laboratory and a parking lot. The school offers Wi-Fi Internet hotspots in the campus to assist students and personnel in their studies and researches.

Programs

Tertiary programs
 Bachelor of Science in computer engineering
 Bachelor of Science in computer science
 Bachelor of Science in accountancy
 Bachelor of Science in business administration majors: human resources development management and marketing management
 Bachelor of Science in secondary education majors: English, mathematics, physical science, biological science, Filipino, technology and livelihood education, and social studies
 Bachelor of Science in elementary education Majors: Preschool Education
 Bachelor of Science in psychology
 Bachelor of Science in office administration
 Bachelor of Science in hotel and restaurant management
 Bachelor of Science in travel management

TESDA Technical Courses
 Programming NC Level IV
 Commercial Cooking NC II
 Housekeeping NC II
 Food and Beverages Services
 Bartending NC II

Basic Education
 High School - Grade 7 to 12
 Elementary - Grade 1 to 6
 Pre-school

Notable alumni

 Ramil L. Hernandez - Governor, Province of Laguna

Universities and colleges in Laguna (province)
Educational institutions established in 1930
Private schools in the Philippines
Education in Calamba, Laguna
1930 establishments in the Philippines